Calogaya is a genus of lichen-forming fungi belonging to the family Teloschistaceae. It has 19 species. The genus was circumscribed in 2013 by Ulf Arup, Ulrik Søchting, and Patrik Frödén.
The generic name Calogaya  ("spectacular Gaya") honours Dr. Ester Gaya (fl. 2001), a Spanish botanist from the University of Barcelona.

Species
Calogaya alaskensis 
Calogaya altynenis  – China
Calogaya arnoldii 
Calogaya arnoldiiconfusa 
Calogaya biatorina 
Calogaya bryochrysion 
Calogaya decipiens 
Calogaya ferrugineoides 
Calogaya haloxyli  – China
Calogaya mogoltanica 
Calogaya orientalis  – China
Calogaya pusilla 
Calogaya qinghaiensis 
Calogaya safavidiorum 
Calogaya saxicola 
Calogaya schistidii 
Calogaya xanthoriella  – China
Calogaya xinjiangensis  – China
Calogaya zoroasteriorum

References

Lichen genera
Teloschistales
Teloschistales genera
Taxa described in 2013